The 2011 Swiss Indoors was a men's tennis tournament played on indoor hard courts. It was the 42nd edition of the event known that year as the Swiss Indoors, and was part of the 500 series of the 2011 ATP World Tour. It was held at the St. Jakobshalle in Basel, Switzerland, from 31 October through 6 November 2011. Roger Federer won the singles title.

ATP players

Seeds

 Seeds are based on the rankings of October 24, 2011

Other entrants
The following players received wildcards into the singles main draw:
  Andy Murray
  Kei Nishikori
  Donald Young

The following players received entry from the qualifying draw:

  James Blake 
  Tobias Kamke
  Łukasz Kubot
  Michael Lammer

The following players received entry from a lucky loser spot:
  Marco Chiudinelli
  Mikhail Kukushkin

Finals

Singles

 Roger Federer  defeated  Kei Nishikori, 6–1, 6–3
It was Federer's 2nd title of the year and 68th of his career. It was his 5th win at Basel, also winning in 2006, 2007, 2008, and 2010.

Doubles

 Michaël Llodra /  Nenad Zimonjić defeated  Max Mirnyi /  Daniel Nestor, 6–4, 7–5

References

External links
Official website

2011 ATP World Tour
2011
Indoors